is a Japanese manga series written and illustrated by Shūzō Oshimi. It began serialization in Kodansha's Bessatsu Shōnen Magazine in April 2020.

Plot 
Welcome Back, Alice is about three friends, Yohei, Kei, and Yui, who are reunited in high school after Kei moves back to their town. What could have been a straightforward love triangle is complicated when Kei shows up looking and dressing like a girl.

Characters 

A high school boy and the main character. Nicknamed "Yo".

A girl who Yohei had a crush on as a child.

The childhood friend of Yohei and Yui who comes back looking like a girl. Kei is very sexually blunt and forward. Kei says that they are no longer a boy, but does not state that they are or wish to be a woman.

Production 
Oshimi has stated that Welcome Back, Alice is about deconstructing male sexuality. The manga deals with adolescent sexual awakening, love and frustration among all three main characters, and the non-binary gender identity of the character Kei.

Publication 
Welcome Back, Alice began serialization in Kodansha's shōnen manga magazine Bessatsu Shōnen Magazine on April 8, 2020.

Reception 
Welcome Back, Alice has received both praise and criticism for its portrayal of gender non-conforming people.
Chris Cimi, in a review of the first volume, praised the manga for not treating Kei's apparent transition like something odd and bizarre and taking an upfront approach, while at the same time wishing that Oshimi had "committed harder" to explicitly describing Kei as transgender or non-binary. Cimi also describes Welcome Back, Alice as feeling like a side project compared to Oshimi's other manga.
Cimi also said that Oshimi's Inside Mari, despite its unrealistic premise, had a stronger impact.

Rebecca Silverman, writing for Anime News Network, criticized Oshimi's Kei as an amalgam of negative stereotypes about LGBTQIA people. Specifically, she describes Kei as seeming to want nothing more than to use his gender and sexuality to tease and torment his childhood friends. Jean-Karlo Lemus, also writing for ANN, stated that the manga deals with dark subjects, such as frustration and confusion, and their relationship with sexuality, as well as freedom from norms, and expressed interest in how the characters develop. He called Welcome Back, Alice a "masterful story".

References

External links 

2020s LGBT literature
Coming-of-age anime and manga
Kodansha manga
Romance anime and manga
School life in anime and manga
Shōnen manga
Shūzō Oshimi
Transgender in anime and manga